Pagurus annulipes, the brown banded hermit crab, is a species of hermit crab in the family Paguridae. It is found in the western Atlantic Ocean.

References

Further reading

 

Anomura
Articles created by Qbugbot
Crustaceans described in 1860